Dave Gale is a Paralympian athlete from Great Britain competing mainly in category F32/51 discus throw events.

He competed in the 2004 Summer Paralympics in Athens, Greece. There he won a bronze medal in the men's F32/51 discus throw event.

External links
 profile on paralympic.org

Paralympic athletes of Great Britain
Athletes (track and field) at the 2004 Summer Paralympics
Paralympic bronze medalists for Great Britain
Living people
Medalists at the 2004 Summer Paralympics
Year of birth missing (living people)
Paralympic medalists in athletics (track and field)
British male discus throwers